In mathematics, the Riemann–Lebesgue lemma, named after Bernhard Riemann and Henri Lebesgue, states that the Fourier transform or Laplace transform of an L1 function vanishes at infinity. It is of importance in harmonic analysis and asymptotic analysis.

Statement 
Let  be an integrable function, i.e.  is a measurable function such that

Because the Fourier transform of an integrable function is continuous, the Fourier transform  is a continuous function vanishing at infinity.

Proof 
We will focus on the one-dimensional case , the proof in higher dimensions is similar. First, suppose that  is continuous and compactly supported. For , the substitution  leads to
.
Taking the mean of both formulas, we arrive at the following estimate:
.
Thus,  converges to 0 as  due to the dominated convergence theorem.

If  is an arbitrary integrable function, it may be approximated in the  norm by a compactly supported continuous function. For , pick a compactly supported continuous function  such that . Then

Other versions
The Riemann–Lebesgue lemma holds in a variety of other situations.

as  within the half-plane .

This follows by extending  by zero outside the interval, and then applying the version of the Riemann–Lebesgue lemma on the entire real line.

 However, the Riemann–Lebesgue lemma does not hold for arbitrary distributions. For example, the Dirac delta function distribution formally has a finite integral over the real line, but its Fourier transform is a constant and does not vanish at infinity.

Applications
The Riemann–Lebesgue lemma can be used to prove the validity of asymptotic approximations for integrals. Rigorous treatments of the method of steepest descent and the method of stationary phase, amongst others, are based on the Riemann–Lebesgue lemma.

References
 
 

Asymptotic analysis
Harmonic analysis
Lemmas in analysis
Theorems in analysis
Theorems in harmonic analysis
Bernhard Riemann